Barkha Bahar is a 1973 Bollywood romance film directed by Amar Kumar and starring Navin Nischol and Rekha.

Cast
Navin Nischol as Rahul Singh
Rekha as Ganga
Helen
Murad
Hiralal
Dulari

Soundtrack

External links
 

1973 films
1970s Hindi-language films
1970s romance films
Films scored by Laxmikant–Pyarelal
Indian romance films
Hindi-language romance films